Pastinacopsis is a genus of flowering plants belonging to the family Apiaceae.

Its native range is Central Asia to Xinjiang.

Species:
 Pastinacopsis glacialis Golosk.

References

Apiaceae
Apiaceae genera